James Patrick Kelly (born April 11, 1951 in Mineola, New York) is an American science fiction author who has won both the Hugo Award and the Nebula Award.

Biography 
Kelly made his first fiction sale in 1975. He graduated magna cum laude from the University of Notre Dame in 1972, with a B.A. in English Literature. After graduating from college, he worked as a full-time proposal writer until 1977. He attended the Clarion Workshop twice, once in 1974 and again in 1976.

Throughout the 1980s, he and his friend John Kessel became involved in the humanist/cyberpunk debate. While Kessel and Kelly were both humanists, Kelly also wrote several cyberpunk-like stories, such as "The Prisoner of Chillon" (1985) and "Rat" (1986). His story "Solstice" (1985) was published in Bruce Sterling's anthology Mirrorshades: The Cyberpunk Anthology.

Kelly has been awarded several of science fiction's highest honors. He won the Hugo Award for his novelette "Think Like a Dinosaur (1995) and again for his novelette 1016 to 1 (1999). Most recently, his 2005 novella, Burn, won the 2006 Nebula Award. Other stories have won the Asimov's Reader Poll and the SF Chronicle Award. He is frequently on the final ballot for the Nebula Award, the Locus Poll Award and the Theodore Sturgeon Memorial Award.

He is currently on the Popular Fiction faculty for the Stonecoast MFA Program in Creative Writing at the University of Southern Maine. He also frequently teaches and participates in science fiction workshops, such as Clarion and the Sycamore Hill Writer's Workshop. He has served on the New Hampshire State Council on the Arts since 1998 and chaired the council in 2004.

He is a frequent contributor to Asimov's Science Fiction and for the past several years has contributed a non-fiction column to Asimov's, "On the Net." He has had a story in the June issue of Asimov's for the past twenty years. In addition to his writing, Kelly has recently turned his hand to editing (with John Kessel), with several reprint anthologies: Feeling Very Strange: The Slipstream Anthology, Rewired: The Post-Cyberpunk Anthology and The Secret History of Science Fiction. Through these anthologies, Kelly and Kessel have brought together a wide spectrum of both traditional genre authors and authors who are considered to be more mainstream, including Don DeLillo, George Saunders, Jonathan Lethem, Aimee Bender, Michael Chabon and Steven Millhauser.

Bibliography

Novels
 
 
 
 The Omega Egg (2007) (with Tobias S. Buckell, Michael A. Burstein, Pat Cadigan, Bill Fawcett, David Gerrold, Brian Herbert, Kay Kenyon, Nancy Kress, Stephen Leigh, Jody Lynn Nye, Laura Resnick, Mike Resnick, Kristine Kathryn Rusch, Robert Sheckley, Dean Wesley Smith and Jane Yolen)

Mariska Volochkova series
 Going Deep (2009)
 Plus or Minus (2010)
 Tourists (2011)
 Mother Go (Audible Studios, 2017) 

Messengers Chronicles

Short fiction 
Collections
 Heroines (1990)
 Think Like a Dinosaur and Other Stories (Golden Gryphon Press, 1997)
 Strange But Not a Stranger (Golden Gryphon Press, 2002)
 The Wreck of the Godspeed and Other Stories (Golden Gryphon Press, 2008)
 Ninety Percent of Everything (2011) (with John Kessel and Jonathan Lethem)
 Masters of Science Fiction: James Patrick Kelly (2016)
 The Promise of Space and Other Stories (2018)
 The First Law of Thermodynamics (2021)
Anthologies (edited)
 Feeling Very Strange: The Slipstream Anthology (Tachyon Publications, 2006) (co-edited with John Kessel)
 Rewired: The Post-Cyberpunk Anthology (Tachyon Publications, 2007) (co-edited with John Kessel)
 The Secret History of Science Fiction (Tachyon Publications, 2009) (co-edited with John Kessel)
 Kafkaesque: Stories Inspired by Franz Kafka (Tachyon Publications, 2011) (co-edited with John Kessel)
 Digital Rapture: The Singularity Anthology (Tachyon Publications, 2012) (co-edited with John Kessel) 
 Nebula Awards Showcase 2012 (Pyr, 2012) (co-edited with John Kessel)
Stories

 "The Propagation of Light in a Vacuum" (Universe 1, 1990)
 "Pogrom" (Asimov's, Jan 1991)
 "Think Like a Dinosaur" (Asimov's, June 1995) (Hugo Award winner)
 "10^16 to 1" (Asimov's, June 1999) (Hugo Award winner)
 "Ninety Percent of Everything" (with Jonathan Lethem and John Kessel) (F&SF, Sep 1999)
 "Undone" (Asimov's, June 2001)
 "The Pyramid of Amirah" (F&SF, March 2002)
 "Barry Westphall Crashes the Singularity" (infinitematrix.net, 2002)
 "Bernardo's House" (Asimov's, June 2003)
 "Men Are Trouble" (Asimov's, June 2004)
 "The Best Christmas Ever" (scifi.com, 2004) (Hugo Award nominee) Audio recordings are available by Walter O'Hara and Jim Kelly.
 "The Edge of Nowhere" (Asimov's, June 2005)
 "Why School Buses Are Yellow" (infinitematrix.net, 2005)
 "The Leila Torn Show" (Asimov's, June 2006)
 "Surprise Party" (Asimov's, June 2008)
 "The Promise of Space" (Clarkesworld Magazine, September 2013)

On the Net : columns from Asimov's Science Fiction

Interviews 
 An Interview with James Patrick Kelly and John Kessel conducted by John Joseph Adams 
 James Patrick Kelly - Audio Interview
 SciFi.com Interview 
 AISFP 55 - James Patrick Kelly Interviewed by Matthew Wayne Selznick  - Audio Interview
 A Rain Taxi Interview with James Patrick Kelly and John Kessel conducted by Matthew Cheney
———————
Notes

References

External links 
 James Patrick Kelly Homepage
 James Patrick Kelly's StoryPod
 Freereads - JPK blog/podcast site
 
 IT Conversations - James Patrick Kelly
 James Patrick Kelly Audiobooks

1951 births
Living people
20th-century American novelists
American male novelists
American male short story writers
American science fiction writers
Asimov's Science Fiction people
Hugo Award-winning writers
Nebula Award winners
People from Mineola, New York
University of Notre Dame alumni
Novelists from New Hampshire
20th-century American short story writers
20th-century American male writers